António "Toninho" Pedro Pires dos Santos (born 12 June 1980) is a Bissau Guinean former footballer who played as a left-back for the Guinea Bissau national team.

International career
Dos Santos made two appearances with the Guinea Bissau national team. He debuted in a 2–1 2006 FIFA World Cup qualification loss to Mali, on 10 October 2003.

References

External links
Fora de Jogo Profile
NFT Profile

1980 births
Sportspeople from Bissau
Bissau-Guinean footballers
Guinea-Bissau international footballers
Association football fullbacks
Leixões S.C. players
S.C. Salgueiros players
Wakefield F.C. players
Liga Portugal 2 players
Campeonato de Portugal (league) players
Bissau-Guinean expatriate footballers
Bissau-Guinean expatriates in Portugal
Bissau-Guinean expatriates in England
Expatriate footballers in Portugal
Expatriate footballers in England
Living people